Barry Johnston may refer to:

 Barry Johnston (footballer) (born 1980), Irish footballer
 Barry Johnston (writer) (born 1949), British writer, audiobook producer, radio presenter and songwriter
 Berry Johnston (born 1935), American poker player

See also
 Barry Johnson (disambiguation)